The Filmfare Best Female Playback Award – Telugu is given by the Filmfare magazine as part of its annual Filmfare Awards South for Telugu films. The first award in Telugu was given in 2006. However, since 1997 till 2005, a common award for playback was available for both Male and Female singers of all the four South Indian languages.

Superlatives

Winners
The following is a list of the award winners and the film and song for which they won.

Nominations
Before 2009, the nominees were announced publicly only in 2006 and 2007. The list along with winners:

2000s 

2006: Smita – "Evaraina" – Anukokunda Oka Roju
 K. S. Chithra – "Manasa Manasa" – Nireekshana
 Kavita Krishnamurthy – "Pilichina" – Athadu
 Malathy – "Jabilammavo" – Bunny
 Shreya Ghoshal – "Pillagali Allari" – Athadu
 Shreya Ghoshal – "Neeke Nuvvu" – Modati Cinema

2007: Mamta Mohandas – "Rakhi Rakhi" – Rakhi
 Gopika Poornima – "Bommanu Geesthe" – Bommarillu
 K. S. Chithra – "Manasa Vaacha" – Godavari
 K. S. Chithra – "Muvvala Navvakala" – Pournami

2009: Shweta Pandit – "Nenani Neevani" – Kotha Bangaru Lokam
 Geetha Madhuri – "Ninne Ninne" – Nachavule
 Sadhana Sargam – "Ninnenaa Nenu" – Salute
 Shreya Ghoshal – "Merupulaa" – Chintakayala Ravi
 Sunitha Upadrashta – "Vayassunamee" – Kantri

2010s 

2010: Priya Himesh – "Ringa Ringa" – Arya 2
  Amruthavarshini – "Meghama" – Prayanam
 Nikitha Nigam – "Dheera Dheera" – Magadheera
 Sunidhi Chauhan – "Saradaga" – Oye!
 Sunitha Upadrashta – "Neela Neela Mabbulu" – Pravarakhyudu

2011: Geetha Madhuri – "Magallu" – Golimaar
 Kousalya – "Bangaru Konda" – Simha
 Suchitra – "Nijamena" – Brindavanam
 Sunitha Sarathy – "Hey CM" – Leader
 Sunitha Upadrashta – "Egiripothe" – Vedam

2012: Shreya Ghoshal – "Jagadhananda Karaka" – Sri Rama Rajyam
 Neha Bhasin – "Hello Hello" – Dhada
 Nithya Menen – "Ammammo Ammo" – Ala Modalaindi
 Ramya – "Poovai Poovai" – Dookudu
 Swathi Reddy – "A Square B Square" – 100% Love

2013: Suchitra – "Saar Osthara" – Businessman
 Gopika Poornima – "Laali Laali" – Damarukam
 Shreya Ghoshal – "Sai Andri Nanu" – Krishnam Vande Jagadgurum
 Shweta Pandit – "Amara Rama" – Shirdi Sai
 Sunidhi Chauhan – "Atu Itu" – Yeto Vellipoyindhi Manasu

2014: K. S. Chithra – "Seethamma Vakitlo" – Seethamma Vakitlo Sirimalle Chettu
 Chinnaponnu – "Mirchi" – Mirchi
 Geetha Madhuri – "Vechhani Vayasu" – Gundello Godari
 Indu Nagaraj – "Pyar Mein Padipoya" – Potugadu
 Shreya Ghoshal – "Hey Nayak" – Naayak

2015: Sunitha Upadrashta – "Yem Sandeham Ledu" – Oohalu Gusagusalade
 Chinmayi – "Ra Rakumara" – Govindudu Andarivadele
 Neha Bhasin – "Aww Tujho Moh" – 1: Nenokkadine
 Shreya Ghoshal – "Chinni Chinni Aasalu" – Manam
 Shruti Haasan – "Junction Lo" – Aagadu

2016: Geetha Madhuri – "Jeevanadhi" – Baahubali: The Beginning
 Aishwarya & K. S. Chithra – "Marhaba" – Malli Malli Idi Rani Roju
 Jonita Gandhi – "Ye Katha" – Kerintha
 Mohana Bhogaraju – "Size Sexy" – Size Zero
 Shreya Ghoshal – "Nijamenani" – Kanche

2017: K. S. Chithra – "Ee Premaki" – Nenu Sailaja
  Amruthavarshini – "Chinuku Taake" – Pelli Choopulu
 Chinmayi – "Oye Meghamala" – Majnu
 Padmalatha & Vishnupriya – "Pareshaanu Raa" – Dhruva
 Ramya Behara & Anjana Sowmya  – "Naidorintikada" – Brahmotsavam

2018: Madhu Priya – "Vachchinde" – Fidaa
 Geetha Madhuri & M. M. Manasi – "Mahanubhavudu" – Mahanubhavudu
 Neha Bhasin – "Swing Zara" – Jai Lava Kusa
 Sameera Bharadwaj – "Madhurame" – Arjun Reddy
 Sonu & Deepu – "Hamsa Naava" – Baahubali 2: The Conclusion

2019: Shreya Ghoshal – "Mandaraa Mandaraa" – Bhaagamathie
 Ananya Bhat – "Yettagayya Shiva Shiva" – Aatagadharaa Siva
 Chinmayi – "Yenti Yenti" – Geetha Govindam
 Mansi – "Rangamma Mangamma" – Rangasthalam
 Mohana Bhogaraju – "Reddamma Thalli" – Aravinda Sametha Veera Raghava
 Ramya Behara – "Gelupu Leni Samaram" – Mahanati

2020s
2020–2021: Indravathi Chauhan – "Oo Antava Oo Oo Antava" – Pushpa: The Rise
Aditi Bhavaraju – "Baavochhadu" – Palasa 1978
Chinmayi – "Manasulone Nilichipoke" – Varudu Kaavalenu
Madhu Priya – "He's So Cute" – Sarileru Neekevvaru
Ramya Behara – "Korameesam Polisoda" – Krack
Sinduri – "Chenguna Chenguna" – Varudu Kaavalenu

References

See also

 List of music awards honoring women
 Filmfare Awards (Telugu)
 Cinema of Andhra Pradesh

Female playback
Music awards honoring women
Indian music awards